This list of most expensive streets (or neighborhoods) by city shows which areas have the highest rental costs or property values in each country.

Residential streets

Residential streets in Africa

South Africa
Cape Town: Nettleton Road, Clifton, Cape Town, De Wet Road, Fresnaye

Residential streets in Asia

Hong Kong 
Mount Nicholson Road (world’s second most expensive street according to Business Insider) 
Mount Kellett Road (world’s sixth most expensive street according to Business Insider) 
Conduit Road (world’s ninth most expensive street according to Business Insider),
Deep Water Bay Road
Severn Road
Barker Road

India
Delhi: Amrita Shergill Marg, Dr APJ Abdul Kalam Road

Israel
Herzliya: Galei Tchelet, Galei Kinneret
Tel Aviv: Hayarkon Street, Kikar Hamedina, Herbert Samuel Street

Turkey
Istanbul: Bağdat Avenue, Bebek, Etiler and Rumeli Hisan

Vietnam
Hanoi: Hang Bong Street

Residential streets in Europe

Austria
Vienna: Kohlmarkt, Tuchlauben, Opernring, Gloriettegasse, Kuppelwiesergasse, Larochegasse, Münichreiterstraße, Schreiberweg, Cottagegasse, Schweizertalstraße, Himmelstraße, Bellevuestraße

Belgium

 Brussels: Square du Bois

Bosnia and Herzegovina
Sarajevo: Ulica Ferhadija, Titova ulica, Marijin Dvor

Bulgaria
Varna: Old Greek Quarter

Denmark
Copenhagen: Hambros Allé

Germany
Kampen (Sylt): Hobookenweg
Berlin: Inselstraße, Königsallee, Am Sandwerder, Im Dol, Paulinenstraße, Weddigenweg
Munich: Maria-Theresia-Straße

Greece
Athens: Herodou Attikou Street

Ireland
Dublin: Shrewsbury Road, Ailesbury Road, Herbert Park

Monaco
Avenue Princesse Grace

Netherlands
 Aerdenhout:
 Leeuwerikenlaan
 Zwaluwenweg
 Wassenaar: Julianaweg
Poland
Warsaw: Nowy Świat Street, Marszałkowska Street, Three Crosses Square

Romania
Bucharest: Dorobanți Road

Russia
Moscow: Ostozhenka, Molochny Pereulok

Spain
Madrid: Serrano, Camino del Sur (La Moraleja), Calle Castillo de Aysa, Paseo de los Lagos (Pozuelo de Alarcón), Avenida Miraflores
Barcelona: Passeig de Gràcia
Málaga: Larios Street, La Zagaleta
Valencia: Carrer de Colom
Palma de Mallorca: Paseig d'alt de la muralla, Carrer Miramall y Palau, La Portella, Carrer Juan Margallen, Paseig Maritim, Carrer Francisco Vidal i Sureda

Sweden
Gothenburg: Kungsportsavenyen
Malmö: Scaniaplatsen
Stockholm: Strandvägen
Uppsala: Kåbovägen
Västerås: Mastvägen

Switzerland
St Moritz: Via Suvretta

United Kingdom
Edinburgh: Ettrick Road in Merchiston, Northurmberland Street, Heriot Row, Ann Street in New Town, Cumin Place, Nile Grove on the Southside
London: The Bishops Avenue, N2, East Finchley, top sales price £65,000,000
London: Kensington Palace Gardens, W8, Kensington, average sales price £36,066,148
London: Eaton Square, SW1, Belgravia, average sales price £4,035,001
London: Belgrave Square, SW1 Belgravia
London: Wilton Crescent, SW1 Belgravia
London: Grosvenor Square, W1 Mayfair
London: Parkside, SW19 Wimbledon, average sales price £5,058,000
London: Wycombe Square, W8 Kensington, average sales price £4,415,000
London: Blenheim Crescent, W11 Holland Park, average sales price £4,346,000
London: Mallord Street, SW3 Chelsea, average sales price £4,091,000
London: Drayton Gardens, SW10 Chelsea, average sales price £4,011,000
London: Hampstead Lane, N6 Hampstead, average sales price £3,657,000
London: Broad Walk, N21 Winchmore Hill, average sales price £3,619,000
London: Cedar Park Gardens, SW19 Wimbledon, average sales price £3,596,000
London: Chester Square, SW1 Westminster, average sales price £3,461,000
London: Duchess Of Bedfords Walk, W8 Kensington, average sales price £3,423,000
London: Chelsea Park Gardens, SW3 Chelsea, average sales price £3,197,000
London: Dawson Place, W2 Notting Hill, average sales price £3,141,000

Residential streets in North America

Canada
Calgary, Alberta:
Pump Hill Close
Roxboro
Mount Royal

Vancouver, British Columbia:
Dunbar-Southlands, Shaughnessy
West Point Grey 

West Vancouver, British Columbia:
Radcliffe Avenue
Belmont Avenue
Westmount

Winnipeg, Manitoba:
Wellington Crescent
Old Tuxedo

United States
Atherton, California:
Walsh Road (median home price US$8 million as of 2019)
Atlanta, Georgia:
Paces Ferry Road
Tuxedo Road

Boston, Massachusetts:
Louisburg Square (average 2019 home price $4.8M)
Charles River Square
Union Street

Houston, Texas:
River Oaks Boulevard
Lazy Lane Boulevard
Carnarvon Drive

Los Angeles, California:
Pacific Coast Highway (world’s eighth most expensive street according to Business Insider),
New York, New York:
57th Street (world’s most expensive street according to Business Insider)
Central Park South (world’s third most expensive street)
Park Avenue (world’s fourth most expensive street)
5th Avenue (world’s seventh most expensive street)
Central Park West

Palm Beach, Florida:
S. Ocean Blvd. (world’s tenth most expensive street according to Business Insider),

Residential streets in Oceania 

Australia
Sydney: Wolseley Road, 
Melbourne: St Georges Road, Albany Road (Toorak), Seacombe Grove, St Ninians Road, Moule Avenue and Glyndon Avenue (Brighton), Monomeath Avenue (Canterbury), Hawthorn Grove (Hawthorn), Shakespeare Grove (Hawthorn) and Coppin Grove (Hawthorn).

New Zealand
Auckland: Cremorne Street, Herne Bay

Residential streets in South America
Brazil
Rio de Janeiro: Avenida Vieira Souto (Ipanema Beach) into Avenida Delfim Moreira (Leblon Beach) and Avenida Prefeito Mendes de Moraes (São Conrado)
São Paulo: Avenida Europa, Avenida Higienópolis, Avenida Amarilis,

Uruguay
Punta del Este: Rambla Lorenzo Batlle Pacheco

Commercial streets

Commercial streets in Africa
South Africa
Cape Town: Victoria & Alfred Waterfront

Commercial streets in Asia

Hong Kong
Causeway Bay: Russell Street
Tsim Sha Tsui: Canton Road

India
New Delhi: Khan Market

Iran
Karaj: Taleghani, Gohardasht, Golshahr, Jahanshahr, Mehrshahr

Japan
Osaka: Umeda
Tokyo: Ginza

Turkey
Istanbul: İstiklal Avenue

Commercial streets in Europe

Belgium
Antwerp: Meir
Brussels: Rue Neuve

Bulgaria
Sofia: Vitosha Boulevard
Varna: Prince Boris I Boulevard

Estonia
Tallinn: Viru street

France
Paris: Avenue des Champs-Champs-Élysées

Germany
Munich: Kaufingerstraße,

Greece
Athens: Ermou Street
Hungary

Budapest: Andrássy Avenue

Ireland
Dublin: Grafton Street

Italy
Milan: Via Monte Napoleone

Netherlands
Amsterdam: Kalverstraat

Portugal
Lisbon: Avenida da Liberdade

Romania
Bucharest: Magheru Boulevard
Bucharest: Victory Avenue

Russia
Moscow: Tverskaya Street

Spain
Barcelona: Portal de l'Àngel
Madrid: Calle Preciados
Málaga: Larios Street

Sweden
Stockholm: Biblioteksgatan

Switzerland
Zürich: Bahnhofstrasse

United Kingdom
London: Bond Street, Brompton Road

Commercial streets in North America

Canada
Toronto, Ontario: Bay Street, Bloor Street (Mink Mile), Yonge Street,

Mexico

 Mexico City: Avenida Presidente Masaryk, Paseo de la Reforma

United States
Boston, Massachusetts: Newbury Street
Chicago, Illinois: North Michigan Avenue (Magnificent Mile)
New York City, New York: Madison Avenue, 5th Avenue
San Francisco, California: Union Square
Beverly Hills, California: Rodeo Drive

Commercial streets in South America
Argentina
Buenos Aires: Florida Street
Buenos Aires: Alvear Avenue

Brazil
Rio de Janeiro: Rua Garcia D'Avila

See also
List of shopping streets and districts by city

References

External links

Streets, expensive
expensive
Expensive streets
Streets
Expensive